The Kean is an apartment building located at 8925 East Jefferson Avenue in Detroit, Michigan, directly adjacent to the Hibbard Apartment Building. It was listed on the National Register of Historic Places in 1985.

Description
The Kean is a striking Art Deco apartment building containing some Romanesque elements. The building is sixteen stories high, containing four apartments per floor. The main structure is brick; the entrance is embellished with light orange terra cotta, inset medallions, and Corinthian columns. The vertical surfaces rise the full height of the building. The hipped roof is tiled, and edged with a red and white checkerboard pattern and projecting gargoyles.

History
The Kean was designed by Charles Noble in 1931. With the onset of the Great Depression, this was the last of the large residential apartments built along Jefferson until well after World War II. The building is currently operated as an apartment building.

References

External links
The Kean at Detroit Living

Apartment buildings in Detroit
National Register of Historic Places in Detroit
Residential buildings completed in 1931
Art Deco architecture in Michigan
Residential buildings on the National Register of Historic Places in Michigan
1931 establishments in Michigan